USS John L. Canley (ESB-6) is the fourth  expeditionary mobile base (ESB) of the United States Navy, and the first ship to be named for Medal of Honor recipient John L. Canley. John L. Canley was constructed in San Diego, California by the National Steel and Shipbuilding Company (NASSCO). The ESDs are operated by the Navy's Military Sealift Command with predominantly civilian crews, while the ESBs, owing to the nature of their operations, have been commissioned and are operated directly by the Navy with military personnel.

Although without any ceremony at the time, the keel for the ship was laid at the NASSCO shipyard in San Diego on 16 November 2020. On 30 April 2022, an official ceremony was held. The ship was christened at the shipyard by Canley's daughter and ship's sponsor Patricia Sargent on 25 June 2022, just five weeks after Canley's death.

References
 

Lewis B. Puller-class expeditionary mobile base
Montford Point-class mobile landing platforms
Amphibious warfare vessels of the United States
Ships built in San Diego
Proposed ships of the United States Navy